Eden Erica Espinosa (born February 2, 1978) is an American actress and singer who is best known for her performances as Elphaba for the Broadway, Los Angeles, and San Francisco productions of the musical Wicked. In 2022, she was nominated for the Children's and Family Emmy Award for Outstanding Voice Performance in a Preschool Animated Program for her role as the Queen of Hearts in Alice's Wonderland Bakery.

Education and early career
Espinosa was born in Anaheim, California, of Mexican descent. She began singing at the age of three, performing at age five, and recording at the age of ten. At Canyon High School, she played the role of Maria in West Side Story. After graduating, Espinosa worked at local theme parks such as Disneyland and Universal Studios. She was also part of the successful performing group The Young Americans, which is based in Southern California and performs in front of audiences worldwide.

Career

Wicked

Espinosa made her Broadway debut as a member of the original Broadway cast of Stephen Schwartz's musical Wicked, which opened on October 30, 2003. She started the production as standby for Idina Menzel in the role of Elphaba. She was also an understudy for the role of Nessarose. Espinosa performed the role of Elphaba for a month continuously during the Summer of 2004, while Menzel was filming Ask the Dust. When going on for Menzel, Espinosa performed alongside opposite Kristin Chenoweth and Jennifer Laura Thompson. Espinosa left Wicked on September 5, 2004, to originate the lead for the Broadway debut of Brooklyn.

Following the closing of Brooklyn the Musical, Espinosa performed the lead role of Elphaba for the Wicked First National tour during the entire San Francisco run, from August 5 to September 11, 2005. She replaced Stephanie J. Block while Block recovered from an injury. For this engagement, she played opposite Kendra Kassebaum as Glinda.

On January 10, 2006, Espinosa returned to perform in the lead role of Elphaba for the Broadway production of Wicked, taking over the role from Shoshana Bean. Espinosa performed for the Wicked celebration of its 1,000th performance on Broadway, on March 21, 2006. Espinosa played opposite both Megan Hilty and Kate Reinders as Glinda on Broadway. She left the Broadway production on October 8, 2006, and was replaced by Ana Gasteyer.

Espinosa received the 2006 Broadway.com Audience Award for "Favorite Female Replacement", in recognition of her performances as Elphaba during her Broadway run as lead.

Espinosa was chosen to originate the role of Elphaba for the third U.S. production of Wicked in Los Angeles, which opened on February 21, 2007, at the Pantages Theatre. She opened the show with former Broadway co-star Megan Hilty as Glinda. She received broad critical acclaim for the role. Espinosa left the Los Angeles company on December 30, 2007, and was replaced by Caissie Levy.

Following the closing of Rent, she returned to the Los Angeles production of Wicked on October 31, 2008, to reprise the role of Elphaba and stayed with the production until its closing night on January 11, 2009. Wicked Los Angeles was one of the most financially successful musicals in Los Angeles theatre history.

On March 2, 2010, Espinosa took over the role of Elphaba from Teal Wicks for the San Francisco production of Wicked. She performed opposite Kendra Kassebaum as Glinda, with whom she had previously performed on the Wicked First National tour when it played in San Francisco. Espinosa left on June 26, 2010, and was replaced by Marcie Dodd. This was the last time Espinosa ever played Elphaba.

Brooklyn the Musical
Espinosa originated and workshopped the title role in Brooklyn the Musical over the course of two years. Its world premiere was on April 30, 2003 (previews), and it ran until June 15, 2003, at the Denver Civic Center.

Espinosa opened in Brooklyn on Broadway at the Plymouth Theatre on October 21, 2004, and stayed with the musical until it closed on June 26, 2005. It played 27 previews and 284 regular performances.

Espinosa was nominated for a 2005 Drama League Award for Distinguished Performance for her performance. She was featured on the original Broadway cast recording of Brooklyn the Musical.

Rent
On May 30, 2008, Espinosa replaced Nicolette Hart as Maureen Johnson (a role again originated by Idina Menzel) in the closing cast of the original Broadway production of Rent at the Nederlander Theatre.

To take part in promotion for the farewell performances of Rent, Espinosa made appearances on Good Morning America and at the 2008 Tony Awards (which featured the original and closing Broadway casts). Rents final Broadway performance,, on September 7, 2008, was also filmed in (which Espinosa is featured).

Additional theatre
Espinosa starred in a production of Flora the Red Menace which ran at UCLA's Freud Playhouse from May 6–18, 2008. After its closing, on September 21, 2008, Espinosa made her West End debut in "Never Neverland", a benefit concert that raised money for British charities Ovarian Cancer Action and NCH. The concert took place at the Duchess Theatre in London.

Espinosa performed as Miranda in the one-night staging of Howard Ashman's previously unproduced musical Dreamstuff on June 23, 2008, at the Hayworth Theatre in Los Angeles, directed by Michael Urie.

Espinosa played the Fairy Godmother in the 2011 Nashville Symphony Orchestra concert version of Cinderella on April 15, 2011, alongside Wicked alum Alli Mauzey, who played the title character.

She headlined the world premiere of the new musical Rain by Michael John LaChiusa as Sadie, at the Old Globe Theatre in San Diego from March 24 to May 1, 2016.

Espinosa played the lead role in Studio Tenn's production of Evita in Nashville, Tennessee, from September 9 to 18, 2016.

In 2018, Espinosa played the role of Daniella in the concert version of Lin-Manuel Miranda's In the Heights.

For an entire year, Espinosa starred as Trina in the 2019 National tour of Falsettos.

On February 17, 2020, Espinosa appeared as one of The Narrators in the 50th Anniversary concert of Joseph and the Amazing Technicolor Dreamcoat at Lincoln Center.

Espinosa starred as the titular character in Lempicka at the Williamstown Theatre Festival in 2018 and later the La Jolla Playhouse from 2019 to 2020.

Solo shows/performances
On October 22, 2005, Espinosa made her solo concert debut with a co-headlining show with Tony Award nominee Euan Morton at Town Hall in New York City part of the venue's Cabaret Festival.

In March 2009, Espinosa performed her solo show entitled "Me" at Joe's Pub in New York City, directed by Billy Porter. She returned to Southern California with her show on Friday, July 24, 2009, at the John Anson Ford Amphitheatre. 

In December 2009, she performed a 2nd solo show entitled "From Eden With Love" at the Razz Room at Hotel Nikko in San Francisco, CA. 

In September 2012, Espinosa became one of the first few major lineup acts opening Feinstein's/54 Below with a themed show paying tribute to the acclaimed singer-songwriter Eva Cassidy.

She was featured as a soloist for Disneyland's new firework spectacular "Magical" premiering in the summer of 2009, where she sang Magical's theme song as well as Disney songs such as "Baby Mine".

In February 2020, Espinosa launched a new acoustic solo show at The Green Room 42 entitled Unplugged & Unplanned. Every concert, the show's setlist would be all new. The February shows were sold out; it included an extension that led into March 2020. However, the final two shows were cancelled due to the COVID-19 pandemic. When live performances started to resume during the Spring of 2021, Espinosa returned and completed the last two shows of the residency.

Today, many of the Espinosa's concerts are done in the style inspired by her Unplugged & Unplanned show rotating the setlist of tunes from her Broadway career, both her solo albums, pop/rock covers, and a Musical Theater fan request section. On August 8, 2021, she headlined her first solo concert on the Las Vegas Strip at The Space Las Vegas. For fans who weren't able to make it, the concert was also livestreamed. On November 13, 2021, Espinosa performed a one night only concert in Holmdel, NJ at the Holmdel Theatre Company (part of the Broadway at the Barn series).

Espinosa is scheduled to bring her concert overseas to London at Cadogan Hall on April 8, 2022.

Solo albums
In August 2012, Espinosa announced she was in the process of recording her debut solo album, featuring modern Broadway hits with a pop sensibility, entitled Look Around. The album was released on December 18, 2012, debuting at #41 on the iTunes Pop Charts. The album also went on to win multiple awards for independent artists including the Independent Music Awards for Pop Album of the Year, Female Pop Vocalist of the Year, and Producer of the Year (which went to Espinosa's producer, Joseph Abate).

On July 25, 2015, Espinosa announced she was in the early development process of her sophomore studio album. Just like with Look Around, she stated a Kickstarter fundraiser to raise money for the album. The album recordings and release were delayed due to Espinosa's schedule with various theater projects, voiceover work, concerts, and personal situations that ended up inspiring the album of the original songs. The sophomore album, entitled "Revelation", was officially released on January 23, 2019. It debuted at #15 on the Pop iTunes charts.

Television
Espinosa has appeared on various television shows, including Law & Order, Robot Chicken, and Dog Whisperer. She had a recurring role in 2009 as the voice of Sasha Caylo on the super robot animated series Titan Maximum, an original show developed for Adult Swim.

In 2007, the ABC series Ugly Betty included performances of "I'm Not That Girl" and "Defying Gravity" in the episode "Something Wicked This Way Comes", featuring Espinosa and other members of Los Angeles Wicked cast.

She has also appeared on the Today Show in 2004, the Macy's Thanksgiving Day Parade TV broadcast in 2004, The Tonight Show with Jay Leno in 2007, and as a performer on the 2008 Tony Awards.

In 2011, she appeared on the animated sketch comedy series Mad episode "Force Code / Flammable" as Katy Putty, a Katy Perry parody made out of Play-Doh who sings about flammability, and performed "Flammable", a spoof on Perry's song "Firework".

In 2016, she voiced Orizaba the moth fairy in the tenth episode of Elena of Avalor, "The Sceptre of Light", and again in 2018 for season two episode 18, "Finding Zuzo".

She voiced Rapunzel’s handmaiden and confidant Cassandra in the 2017 film Tangled: Before Ever After and in Tangled: The Series/Rapunzel's Tangled Adventure. For the show, she sang the lead vocals for the song "Waiting in the Wings", composed by Alan Menken and Glenn Slater, which won the 2020 Daytime Emmy Award for Outstanding Original Song in a Children's, Young Adult or Animated Program.

In 2022, she voiced The Queen Of Hearts in Disney Junior's Alice's Wonderland Bakery. 

She sang vocals in the musical number titled "TRUCKS" in the episode of the same name of Cars on the Road.

Game Night
During the COVID-19 pandemic, Espinosa along with real life best friend vocalist and Rent alumna Kamilah Marshall collaborated with California based Regional house Musical Theatre West creating a weekly web series on Instagram Live entitled Game Night with Eden & Kamilah. The series featured the duo in a friendly competition playing a series of Musical Theatre themed trivia games. The series would go Live every Thursday night on Instagram. However, the plug got pulled from them doing the lives due to the change of restrictions of use of music on the lives on social media. They later moved it to being an interactive show on Zoom featuring fans playing along. Most recently, Game Night was then changed to a real live studio game show featuring both Espinosa and Marshall hosting with special Broadway guests. It was released on Broadstream on November 3, 2021.

Personal life
Eden married managing producer Joseph Abate on October 16, 2010. They divorced in 2019.

Filmography

Recordings
 Top 25 Praise Songs – Updated (2000)
 Top 25 Acoustic Worship Songs (2002)
 The Maury Yeston Songbook (2003)
 Hair – The Actors' Fund of America Benefit Recording (2005)
 Bright Lights, Big City (2005 concept album)
 Brooklyn the Musical (2005 Original Broadway Cast Recording)
 Dreaming Wide Awake: The Music of Scott Alan (2007)
 David Burnham – featured duet: "As Long as You're Mine" (2007)
 Magical: Disney's New Nighttime Spectacular of Magical Celebrations (Disneyland, 2009) – Featured Vocals
 Celebrate! Tokyo Disneyland (Tokyo Disneyland, 2018) – Featured Vocals

Solo albums
 Look Around (2012)
 Revelation (2019)

References

External links

Eden Espinosa on Twitter

1978 births
Living people
American musical theatre actresses
American voice actresses
American stage actresses
American women singers
American musicians of Mexican descent
Musicians from Anaheim, California
Actresses from Anaheim, California
Actresses from Orange County, California
American actresses of Mexican descent
Singers from California
Hispanic and Latino American musicians
The Young Americans members
Hispanic and Latino American women singers
Hispanic and Latino American actresses
21st-century American women